Greenstown is an unincorporated community in Fayette County, West Virginia, United States.

The community derives its name from William Green, the original owner of the town site; a variant name was Towne.

References 

Unincorporated communities in West Virginia
Unincorporated communities in Fayette County, West Virginia